Makeyev is a Russian surname that may refer to:

Alexei Makeyev (born 1991), Russian ice hockey player
Oleg Makeyev (born 1978), Russian footballer
Pavel Makeyev (born 1966), Russian football coach
Sergei Makeyev (born 1966), Russian footballer
Viktor Makeyev (1924–1985), Soviet scientist
Yevgeni Makeyev (born 1989), Russian footballer

See also
Makeyev Rocket Design Bureau, a Russian missile design company

Russian-language surnames